William Stewart Montgomery "Bud" Wilson (August 20, 1909 – November 15, 1964) was a Canadian figure skater. Competing in singles, he became the 1932 Olympic bronze medallist, the 1932 World silver medallist, a six-time North American champion, and a nine-time Canadian national champion.

Personal life 
Wilson was born in Toronto in 1909. During World War II, he was a Major in the army artillery, earning the Bronze Star. He died in 1964 at the age of 55 from throat cancer.

Career 
Wilson first entered the Canadian Championships in 1924 at the age of 13 and placed second. He would win nine senior national titles between 1929 and 1939. In 1932, he won the silver medal at the World Figure Skating Championships and the bronze medal at the Winter Olympics in singles.

Wilson also competed in pair skating with his sister Constance Wilson-Samuel. Together, they won numerous Canadian and North American championships.

Wilson turned professional in 1939 and began his teaching career in St. Paul, Minnesota, where he stayed until interrupted by World War II. Following his army service, he joined the Skating Club of Boston as the club's senior professional and director of its annual carnival, The Ice Chips. He coached the following skaters:
 Dudley Richards, U.S. pair skating champion, World and Olympic competitor 
 Bradley Lord, U.S. men's singles champion and World competitor 
 Gregory Kelley, U.S. men's singles silver medallist and World competitor
 Tina Noyes, U.S. national medallist, Olympic and World competitor

Wilson was inducted into the World Figure Skating Museum and Hall of Fame (1976), Skate Canada Hall of Fame (1990), Professional Skaters Association Coaches Hall of Fame (2003), and Canadian Olympic Hall of Fame (2007).

Results

Men's singles

Pairs with Wilson-Samuel

Fours 
(with Dorothy Caley, Hazel Caley, and Ralph McCreath)

(with Constance Wilson-Samuel, Elizabeth Fisher, and Hubert Sprott)

References

1909 births
1964 deaths
Canadian male single skaters
Canadian male pair skaters
Figure skaters at the 1928 Winter Olympics
Figure skaters at the 1932 Winter Olympics
Figure skaters at the 1936 Winter Olympics
Olympic bronze medalists for Canada
Olympic figure skaters of Canada
Figure skaters from Toronto
Olympic medalists in figure skating
World Figure Skating Championships medalists
Medalists at the 1932 Winter Olympics
Canadian military personnel of World War II
20th-century Canadian people